Wild River Country was an outdoor water park located in North Little Rock, Arkansas, United States. It was the largest water park in the state of Arkansas.   It was a popular attraction of the city and saw many visitors from all over the region. It however was unable to open for the 2020 season due to legal reasons and was sold in auction.

Attractions
Lazy River
Water slides
Wave pool area
Kiddy play area, with small slides, water blasters & water falls
Sand Volley Ball

Specialty rides
Cyclone, Two, Three, or Four person raft ride
Vertigo, vortex water slide
Pipeline, two-person roller coaster style ride
Sidewinder, 200 foot serpentine ride
Accelerator, vertical high-speed slide
Wild River Rapids, A five level ride
Vortex, A black covered body ride
Black Lightning and White Lightning Twin body rides sharing a launch platform
AquaLoop, Looping body slide

Closing of the Park in 2020
News article posted online in February 2020 described the park was to be auctioned off after having over five years of unpaid taxes totaling over $282,000. Calls to the phone number listed on the website were met with a busy signal, the official Facebook page was deleted and the website is no longer in working order.

References

External links
 Wild River Country official site
 

1985 establishments in Arkansas
Buildings and structures in Pulaski County, Arkansas
Water parks in Arkansas
Defunct amusement parks in the United States
Tourist attractions in Pulaski County, Arkansas
Amusement parks opened in 1985
Amusement parks closed in 2020